The Field Elm cultivar Ulmus minor 'Plotii', commonly known as Lock Elm or Lock's Elm (its vernacular names), Plot's Elm or Plot Elm, and first classified as Ulmus sativa Mill. var. Lockii and later as Ulmus plotii by Druce in 1907-11 (see 'Etymology'), is endemic mainly to the East Midlands of England, notably around the River Witham in Lincolnshire, in the Trent Valley around Newark-on-Trent, and around the village of Laxton, Northamptonshire. Ronald Melville suggested that the tree's distribution may be related to river valley systems, in particular those of the Trent, Witham, Welland, and Nene. Two further populations existed in Gloucestershire. It has been described as Britain's rarest native elm, and recorded by The Wildlife Trust as a nationally scarce species.

As with other members of the Field Elm group, the taxonomy of Plot Elm has been a matter of contention, several authorities, notably Professor Clive A. Stace in New Flora of the British Isles (2010), recognizing it as a species in its own right. It is as U. plotii Druce that the specimens held by the Royal Botanic Gardens at Kew and Wakehurst Place are listed. R. H. Richens, however, contended (1983) that it is simply one of the more distinctive clones of the polymorphous Ulmus minor, conjecturing that it arose as an U. minor sport and that its incidence in the English Midlands may have been linked to its use as a distinctive marker along Drovers' roads. After Richens had challenged the species hypothesis, the tree was the subject of a study at the Royal Botanic Garden Edinburgh by Dr Max Coleman (2000), which showed that trees a perfect fit with the 'type' material of Plot elm were of a single clone (genetically identical to each other). Arguing in a 2002 paper that there was no clear distinction between species and subspecies, and suggesting that known or suspected clones of U. minor, once cultivated and named, should be treated as cultivars, Coleman preferred the designation U. minor 'Plotii' to U. minor var. plotii, a form used in late 20th-century publications.

Alfred Rehder considered Ulmus Plotii Druce to be synonymous with Jonathan Stokes' Ulmus surculosa argutifolia which was located at Furnace Mill near North Wingfield, Derbyshire, before 1812.  Earlier still, a herbarium specimen labelled Ulmus angustissima collected in the 1670s by Edward Morgan, the Welsh botanist referred to by Evelyn in his Diary and colleague of Thomas Johnson, was identified by Druce in 1919 as Ulmus plotii. Morgan's source location is not recorded; the nearest Plot Elm (recorded in the 20th century) to his North Wales home was in Shropshire.

Augustine Henry, though he equated the elm with Druce's, miscalled it Goodyer's Elm (U. minor 'Goodyeri'). The trees John Goodyer discovered were near the south coast at Pennington, Hampshire, some 200 miles away from centre of distribution of 'Plotii' and very dissimilar in structure.

Description
Richens stated that "a unilateral habit is the prime diagnostic feature of U. plotii." This habit of branching tends to make Plot appear narrow from some angles. Richens likened its appearance to an ostrich feather, and noted "a general tendency for shoots to continue growth as long shoots". Melville noted that Plot "is unusually variable in the type of shoot produced on normal branches of the crown. In some seasons trees produce occasional branches bearing only semi-long shoots – i.e. shoots intermediate in character between typical short-shoots and the long extension shoots." These semi-long shoots (also known as "proliferating short-shoots") have smaller, more rounded, more coarsely toothed leaves. The bark remains smooth for several years. A few longer lower branches were often a feature of its profile; the form of old trees will have depended on whether or not these survived cropping and pruning. The obovate to elliptic acuminate leaves are small, nearly equal at the base, rarely > 4 cm in length, with comparatively few marginal teeth, usually < 70; the upper surfaces dull, with a scattering of minute tubercles and hairs. The samarae rarely ripen, but when mature are narrowly obovate, < 13 mm in length, with a triangular open notch.

Stokes' Ulmus surculosa argutifolia (1812) [: 'bright-leaved twiggy elm'], considered by Rehder a description of the elm pre-dating Druce's by a century, was a tree with erect stem and branches throughout its length, and with small elliptic leaves, scabrous above and villose beneath, 1 to 2.5 inches long, that narrowed at the base, with margins meeting petiole nearly opposite each other.

Pests and diseases
'Plotii' is very susceptible to Dutch elm disease.

Etymology
The tree was first classified by the Oxford botanist George Claridge Druce in 1907-11, who found examples at Banbury and Fineshade, Northamptonshire, and published descriptions with photographs. Druce named the tree for Dr Robert Plot, a 17th-century English naturalist. The older vernacular name 'Lock Elm', in use since at least 1742, is said to be an allusion to the difficulty in working its timber. Druce, however, wrote in 1913 that 'The wood is of very good quality, easy to work, and of a different texture from the Wych, Dutch, or English Elm, and has a general usefulness as a substitute for Ash or Wych Elm. The name Locks Elm can have no reference to any difficulty in working or dressing of the wood.' 'Lock' may be related to its use in boundaries, as 'loc' is Old English for enclosure. Lock Elm may have been one of the plants used in witchcraft to open locks and reveal hidden treasure. Richens called the tree U. minor. var. lockii. A. R. Horwood in his book British Wild Flowers – In Their Natural Haunts, called it the 'Northamptonshire Elm'.

Bancroft referred to Plot's Elm as the 'East Anglian Elm', adding that it was often referred to as Wych Elm in the region; however, she was almost certainly alluding to the Smooth-leaved Elm.

Cultivation

Plot-type elms had been noted as distinctive and were being cultivated in collections before they were botanically classified by Druce (1911), as evidenced by the two specimens at Westonbirt House (mature by 1912 when Augustine Henry photographed one of them for his Trees of Great Britain & Ireland) and the tree at Eastington Park. Melville confirmed by field studies in the 1930s that Druce's specimens were typical ('the type'), but believing plotii to be a species and so to some extent variable he also admitted to Kew 'Plot Elms' that varied from the type. Cultivation in the decades that followed, influenced by Melville or sourced from Kew, allowed similar latitude. Following Coleman's findings about the type (2000) and his paper on British elms (2002), atypical Plot's Elms or 'Plot-type' elms are classified as Ulmus aff. 'Plotii'. These are very close to Plot's Elm and have a number of characteristics of the type, but their crowns are too broad and regular to match "true Plot". Melville himself, from the 1940s, had used the name Ulmus aff. plotii for elms close to Plot but outside the range of his variable species.

Melville believed that the tree, scattered in distribution by the 20th century, was formerly more abundant. William Henry Wheeler in his History of the fens of south Lincolnshire, being a description of the rivers Witham and Welland and their estuary (1897) – a Plot area – wrote: "The tree  of  the  Fenland  and  the  one  which  attains  to  a  very  large  growth is  the  elm". An uncommon tree even before Dutch elm disease, 'Plotii' has also been affected by the destruction of hedgerows and by urban development within its limited range. No mature 'type' trees are known to survive. One of the last known stands of semi-mature Plot elms, the Madingley Road elms descended from those described by Elwes and Henry in 1913 and by Richens in 1960, was destroyed by the City Council of Richens's own Cambridge in road-widening c.2007–2014. Unlike other forms of Field Elm, 'Plotii' is not a prolific generator of root suckers, but it is not considered critically endangered. Conservation measures were drafted to preserve known stands and to encourage propagation, though it is not clear if any of these were implemented.

"A landscape of such trees," wrote Richens in 1956, "such as occurs in parts of northern Northamptonshire, is highly distinctive, and rather suggestive of a Japanese print." "The Plot Elm is a beautiful tree," agreed Gerald Wilkinson, with "a silhouette no broader than Wheatley's." Wilkinson regarded as a "lost opportunity" the failure of East Midlands councils to cultivate this local elm in preference to exotic plantsmen's varieties. "Unhappily, the plumes of U. plotii  are no longer a common feature of the landscape of the Trent above Newark and the Witham above Lincoln. Elms are now [1978] few in these areas that were once the home of Plot Elm. A wartime shortage of wood, altered drainage levels, land clearance for power stations, and machine farming have all combined into the familiar pattern of short-term efficiency and long-term degradation."

Elms labelled 'Plotii' were included in botanical collections such as Kew Gardens, Royal Botanic Garden Edinburgh, University of Dundee Botanic Garden (the two latter by Edward Kemp), and Belmonte Arboretum, Wageningen. In the UK 'Plot Elm' was propagated and marketed by the Hillier & Sons nursery, Winchester, Hampshire, from 1949, with 38 sold from 1965 to 1977, when production ceased. Its presence in the Hillier nursery suggests that it was also represented in the Hillier Arboretum in the mid-20th century. The tree is now only planted occasionally owing to its susceptibility to Dutch elm disease. It appears in National Elm Collection lists, but no specimen is known in the Brighton area (2015).

In continental Europe, 'Plotii' was distributed by the Späth nursery of Berlin from at least 1930 onwards, as U. minor Mill. (U. sativa Moss), 'Goodyer-Rüster' [:'Goodyer Elm'], "a tall tree up to 30 m, of upright growth and [with] pendulous [branchlets]". Späth knew Elwes and Henry's 1913 work, with its photograph of one of the Westonbirt trees so named, so is likely to have sourced 'Plotii' either from Westonbirt or from one of Elwes and Henry's other source locations. (The real Goodyer's Elm was rediscovered by Melville in the later 1930s.) Rehder (1949) gives U. sativa Moss as a synonym of 'Plotii'. A specimen stood in Zuiderpark, The Hague, in the mid-20th century. The U. minor that stood in the Ryston Hall arboretum, Norfolk, in the early 20th century  may have been Plot Elm, referred to as U. minor in the leading UK tree survey of the day, Elwes and Henry (1913). Späth sent numerous elms to Ryston, but the date when he began supplying Ulmus minor [:Plot Elm] is unknown. Three young specimens were reported (2014) from in a private garden at Seyne les Alpes, France. 

In the USA, the " U. minor = U. sativa " introduced as "young grafted plants" to the Arnold Arboretum, Massachusetts, c.1915, may have been Plot Elm, as the arboretum's July 1915 article on European Elms reporting this accession is based on Elwes and Henry's 1913 book and nomenclature. The young trees were established by 1918 and still present in 1922, the arboretum then considering them possibly the only specimens of this kind of elm in the US.

Notable trees
The type tree at Banbury was blown down in a gale around 1943; the timber was donated to the Royal Botanic Gardens, Kew. A mature avenue of the 'type' tree stood at Newton on Trent, Lincolnshire, in the early 20th century and a notable quantity grew by the river Tove at Towcester and was present until at least 1955. A large assemblage of Plot elm survives (2015) as a hedge of young trees near Caythorpe, Nottinghamshire. Two large trees survive near Calceby, Lincolnshire (2016).

One of two late 19th-century specimens in the parkland of Westonbirt House, mature by 1912 when Henry photographed it for his Trees of Great Britain & Ireland, was said by Elwes to be the largest-known tree of its kind in Britain. A clearer, winter photograph appears in Bruce Jackson's Catalogue of the Trees & Shrubs in the Collection of Sir George Lindsay Holford (1927). The 1921 girth is consistent (on circumference-growth estimates for elm) with a c.1820s planting date – that is, a decade after Stokes published his 1812 description, matching Westonbirt, and giving source-location, of his Ulmus surculosa argutifolia. Elwes and Henry examined Druce's 'type' trees in Banbury and the elms of Madingley Road, Cambridge, as well as the Westonbirt specimens, and considered all three the same "species". Another notable specimen, described in Flora of Gloucestershire (1948) as U. plotii Druce, stood in the grounds of Eastington House, Ampney St Peter, Gloucestershire, till blown down c.1947.

Natural hybrids
Plot Elm hybridizes in the wild both with wych elm, to form U. × hollandica 'Elegantissima', and with U. minor to form Ulmus × viminalis. Melville noted that within the limits of the tree's distribution, hybrids are more common than Plot Elm itself.

Hybrid cultivars
Elms of the Ulmus × viminalis group have been cultivated since the 19th century and have given rise to a hybrid cultivar of that name and to the cultivars 'Aurea', 'Marginata', 'Pulverulenta'. The 19th-century cultivar 'Myrtifolia' was considered by Melville to be a probable U. minor × U. minor 'Plotii' hybrid. The cultivar Wentworth Elm was identified by the Royal Botanic Garden Edinburgh as a hybrid of Huntingdon Elm and Plot Elm, though Melville dismissed the specimen growing at the Royal Botanic Gardens, Kew as Huntingdon Elm. The 20th-century dwarf elm cultivar 'Jacqueline Hillier' is thought to belong to the 'Elegantissima' group. The cultivar 'Etrusca' was identified by Melville as a hybrid of U. glabra × U. minor 'Plotii'.

In art, photography, and literature

George Lambert's landscape 'View of Dunton Hall, Lincolnshire', painted in 1739 near Tydd St Mary within the native range of Plot Elm, shows a narrow monopodial elm-like tree with short branches and cocked crown, that may be a rare representation of Plot Elm in art. Tydd St Mary is between the rivers Nene and Welland, by both of which Melville had noted the presence of Plot Elm.

What appear to be two Plot elms stand in the background of Ernest Arthur Rowe's painting 'Revesby Abbey, Lincolnshire, The Rose Garden' (1898).  Elwes (1913) mentioned Plot elm at Hagnaby Priory, East Kirkby, near Revesby Abbey. Rowe (1863–1922) was known for his meticulous attention to botanical detail.

Walter Hutchinson's four-volume Britain Beautiful (1920), a pictorial celebration of the British Isles that includes a number of elm landscapes, contains a photograph by Herbert Felton, FRPS (1888-1968) of a notable Plot elm by King's Mill, Stamford, Lincolnshire, c.1910, a tall undamaged double-stemmed tree, with long lateral boughs like a sparse-branched cedar of Lebanon. Of such well-grown specimens Melville wrote: "In old age Plot is matched by no other elm for character and individuality".

A description in E. B. C. Jones's novel Morning and Cloud (1932) of asymmetrical elms in Hertfordshire, where Plot Elm was present, may be a rare literary reference to 'Plotii'.

Accessions

Europe
 Grange Farm Arboretum, Lincolnshire, UK. As U. minor 'Plotii'. Acc. no. 1081.
 Wakehurst Place Garden, Wakehurst Place, UK, as U. plotii. Acc. no. 1912-59402, donated by Augustine Henry, acc. nos. 1975–6181, 1975–6195, all collected by Ronald Melville.
 Royal Botanic Gardens Kew, UK, as U. plotii, acc. no. 1969-16753, (planted 1958), donated by Melville.

North America
 Bartlett tree nurseries. Acc. nos. 7771, 00–108, as U. plotii, provenances not disclosed.

Synonyms
 Ulmus angustissima: Edward Morgan MSS "Hortus siccus" (c.1672); Druce (1919)
Ulmus surculosa argutifolia Stokes.
Ulmus sativa var. Lockii Druce.
Ulmus minor Henry (non Miller).
Ulmus sativa Moss (non Miller).
Ulmus Plotii Druce.
Ulmus minor var. lockii Richens.

The Laxton court-case
It is not known whether what the Press called "lofty Italian elms" on the village green of Laxton, Northamptonshire (later identified as a Plot hub), the felling of which in 1937 caused a fracas between conservationists and police and led to a court-case, were U. plotii, perhaps miscalled by outsiders by analogy with similarly narrow Italian poplar.

Notes

References

External links 
 'Plot Elms' (Ulmus minor 'Plotii'), www.plot-elms.co.uk
 'The Plot Elm', resistantelms.co.uk
 http://www.ipgri.cgiar.org/Networks/euforgen/Networks/Scattered_Broadleaves/NHStrategies/UlmusSppConsStrategy.htm.
 Ulmus minor var. plotii Action Plan, The Wildlife Trust
 Ulmus minor var. plotii, The Flora of Derbyshire, Derby City Council

Herbarium specimens
  Ulmus plotii (Druce's "type" specimen, Banbury, 1911)
  Sheet labelled U. plotii Druce (W. J. Stearn specimen, Shawbury, Shropshire, 1942)
  Ulmus plotii (Melville's specimen, Banbury, 1946)
  U. plotii, Zuiderpark, The Hague, long-shoots specimen, possibly juvenile (1954)
  Sheet labelled U. plotii Druce (R. C. L. Howitt specimen, Caythorpe, Nottinghamshire, 1957) 
  Sheet labelled U. plotii Druce (Melville and Heybroek specimen, Banbury, Oxfordshire, 1958)
  Sheet labelled Ulmus, Madingley Road, Cambridge (Heybroek specimen, 1960) (?)

Semi-juvenile leaves
  Sheet labelled U. plotii Druce (semi-juvenile tree; W. J. Stearn specimen, Lee Brockhurst, Shropshire, 1942)   
  U. minor Mill., "fitting description of U. plotii Druce (juvenile leaves; Westborough, Lincs., RBGE specimen, 1998)
  U. minor Mill., "fitting description of U. plotii Druce (juvenile leaves; Laxton, Northants., RBGE specimen, 1998)
  U. minor Mill., "fitting description of U. plotii Druce (juvenile leaves; Barrowby, Lincs., RBGE specimen, 1998)

Ulmus
Endemic flora of England
East Midlands
Field elm cultivar
Ulmus articles with images
Trees of Europe
Taxa named by George Claridge Druce
Garden plants of Europe
Ornamental trees